The Despotate of Lovech, was a Bulgarian state, covering parts of the territory of what is now Lovech Province, formed in 1330 after Ivan Alexander was appointed to govern Lovech, the capital of the despotate, and the nearby area around the town. It was dissolved after the fall of the Lovech Fortress in 1446 to the Ottomans.

The state was the last independent Bulgarian state after 1396, before its conquest by the Ottoman Empire. It was ruled by the Sratsimir dynasty.

History

Formation 
The despotate was formed after Ivan Alexander became the despot, most likely being appointed due to Lovech being a major town that controlled commercial passage through the Stara Planina passes, and the migration of intellectuals to Moldavia and Wallachia, due to Ottoman conquests.

Period of prosperity 
The area was the center for many Bulgarian rulers. In the 14th century, the commercial, administrative and spiritual centres were at their peak. The despot also made a great contribution towards stopping the Serbian advance, although Bulgaria still lost the battle of Velbazhd. Ivan married Princess Theodora of Wallachia. He gradually won trust to become the elected Tsar of Bulgaria in 1331, after Ivan Stefan was driven out by a coup d'état, and the conspirators placed him on the throne.

Dissolution 
Ivan Alexander died on 17 February 1371. Despite his early years of success, his later decisions, such as splitting the empire among his sons in 1356, left the Bulgarian states to face outside powers politically divided and weakened, contributing to the fall of the despotate. The Ottoman invasions of Bulgaria in the 14th century did not directly result in the despotate being conquered. Stanko Kosan defended the town until its conquest by the Ottomans in 1446.

See also 
Lovech
Lovech Fortress
Second Bulgarian Empire
Lovech Municipality
Lovech Province
Sratsimir dynasty
Ivan Alexander of Bulgaria
History of Bulgaria

References 

Second Bulgarian Empire
Bulgarian Empire
Despotate of Lovech
History of Bulgaria by province
Lovech Province
Despots (court title)
Despotates
Medieval Bulgaria
History of Bulgaria by period
Middle Ages by country
Medieval history of the Balkans